Sarh is an impact crater in the southeasternmost area of the Argyre quadrangle on Mars at 64.85 S and 14.85° W. It is 50.27 km in diameter. Its name refers to Sarh, a city in Chad.

Image

See also
 List of craters on Mars

References 

Argyre quadrangle
Impact craters on Mars